Abendroth Peak is a peak  northeast of Stockton Peak on the divide between the Murrish and Gain Glaciers in Palmer Land, Antarctica. It was named by the Advisory Committee on Antarctic Names (US-ACAN) for Ernst K. Abendroth, United States Antarctic Research Program (USARP) biologist at Palmer Station in 1968.

Mountains of Palmer Land